Kimberly Poore Moser (born June 8, 1962) is an American politician who has served in the Kentucky House of Representatives from the 64th district since 2017.

References

1962 births
Living people
Republican Party members of the Kentucky House of Representatives
21st-century American politicians
21st-century American women politicians
Women state legislators in Kentucky